James Mackie may refer to:
James Stuart Mackie (1860–1949), Canadian businessman and politician
Jamie Mackie (born 1985), English born footballer
Jamie Mackie (1924–2011), Australian political scientist and SE Asian specialist
Jim Mackie (1889–1917), Australian rules footballer
James Mackie (EastEnders), fictional character
James Mackie (MP) (1821–1867), British member of parliament for Kirkcudbright
James Mackie (moderator), Church of Scotland minister and historian
James Mackie (died 1744), commander of the Royal Navy fire-ship  from 1742 to 1744

See also
James Mackey (disambiguation)
James McKay (disambiguation)
James McKie (disambiguation)